The Venezuelan Summer League (VSL) was a professional baseball sports league that operated in Venezuela from 1997 to 2015, primarily in the state of Carabobo. Teams in the league served as academies for Major League Baseball (MLB) organizations, and were classified at the Rookie League level within Minor League Baseball.

History
The VSL was created in 1997 as an alternative to the Dominican Summer League (DSL) to improve the development of young prospects from Venezuela in their early years in organized baseball. Besides Carabobo, the states of Aragua, Lara and Yaracuy were represented in the league.

Each team had a roster limit of 35 active players, at least 10 of which had to be pitchers. No player on the active list could have more than four years of minor league service. There were no age limits. The league was closed to all MLB Draft eligible players; that is, players from the United States, Canada and Puerto Rico. Exceptions were made for two players from Puerto Rico. In addition to Venezuela, players in the league came from Argentina, Colombia, Curaçao, Dominican Republic, El Salvador, Mexico, Nicaragua, Panama, and Sint Maarten.

The regular season champion and runner-up played a best-of-three-games playoff series for the league championship.

The league had six squads in its first season, 1997, via three teams fielding split-squads. By 1999, the league had grown to 10 individual teams, and had nine teams as late as 2007. The league reduced to four teams in 2012, played the next two seasons with five teams, and was again reduced to four teams in 2015. Political instability in the region led to more teams opting out before the 2016 season, resulting in the league shutting down.

Venezuela would go without a summer professional baseball league until 2021, when the Venezuelan Major League was established.

Teams

1997–2004
Teams during this period were named for the city they operated in.

Single-squad teams

Source:

Split-squad teams
These clubs operated as split-squads, fielding two teams denoted by numbers (e.g. VSL Venoco 1 and VSL Venoco 2).

Source:

2005–2015
Teams during this period were named for their affiliated MLB team(s).

Single-affiliate teams

Source:

Cooperative teams
Note that cooperative teams are linked to their respective teams (e.g. VSL Cubs/Twins links to VSL Cubs and VSL Twins).

Source:

League champions

 1997 – VSL Maracay 2
 1998 – VSL Guacara 1
 1999 – VSL Chino Canónico
 2000 – VSL San Felipe
 2001 – VSL Venoco
 2002 – VSL Aguirre
 2003 – VSL San Felipe
 2004 – VSL Tronconero 2
 2005 – VSL Astros
 2006 – VSL Phillies
 2007 – VSL Astros
 2008 – VSL Pirates
 2009 – VSL Rays
 2010 – VSL Pirates 
 2011 – VSL Rays
 2012 – VSL Phillies
 2013 – VSL Mariners
 2014 – VSL Tigers
 2015 – VSL Tigers

Source:

MLB alumni
VSL players who have gone on to make MLB appearances include:

José Altuve (HOU)
José Alvarado (TBR)
Wladimir Balentien (SEA)
Asdrúbal Cabrera (SEA)
Ramón Cabrera (PIT)
Ezequiel Carrera (TOR)
Yonny Chirinos (TBR)
Argenis Díaz (BOS)
Elías Díaz (PIT)
Félix Doubront (BOS)
Luis Durango (SDP)
Sergio Escalona (PHI)
Eduardo Escobar (CWS)
Víctor Gárate (HOU)
Avisail García (DET)
Severino González (PHI)
Mayckol Guaipe (SEA)
Jesús Guzmán (SEA)
César Hernández (PHI)
Oscar Hernández (TBR)
Dilson Herrera (PIT)
Edgar Ibarra (MIN)
Gregory Infante (CWS)
Dixon Machado (DET)
Jean Machi (PHI)
Germán Márquez (TBR)
David Martínez (HOU)
Yoervis Medina (SEA)
Diego Moreno (PIT)
Omar Narváez (TBR)
Ángel Nesbitt (DET)
Lester Oliveros (DET)
José Ortega (DET)
Hernán Pérez (DET)
Erasmo Ramírez (SEA)
Wilking Rodríguez (TBR)
Bruce Rondón (DET)
Josmil Pinto (MIN)
José Quintana (NYM) 
J. C. Ramírez (SEA)
Felipe Rivero (TBR)
Miguel Rojas (CIN)
Jorge Rondón (STL)
Rómulo Sánchez (PIT)
Eduardo Sánchez (STL)
Eugenio Suárez (DET)
Rubén Tejada (NYM)
Ronald Torreyes (CIN)
Wilfredo Tovar (NYM)
Luis Valbuena (SEA)
Felipe Vázquez (TBR)
Brayan Villarreal (DET)

Note: team affiliations reflect a player's organization while in the VSL; the player may have reached MLB with a different franchise.

See also
 Venezuelan Major League

References

External links
Official website archived March 2016 via Wayback Machine
VSL Encyclopedia and History at Baseball-Reference.com

Venezuelan Summer League
Minor league baseball leagues
Baseball leagues in Venezuela
Sports leagues established in 1997
Sports leagues disestablished in 2015
1997 establishments in Venezuela
2015 disestablishments in Venezuela
Defunct baseball leagues